Earthquakes in Vanuatu are frequent and are sometimes accompanied by tsunami, though these events are not often destructive. The archipelago, which was formerly known as New Hebrides, lies atop a complex and active plate boundary in the southwestern Pacific Ocean.

Overall, the population in this region resides in structures that are highly vulnerable to earthquake shaking, though some resistant structures exist. Most buildings in Vanuatu are constructed with lumber.

Tectonic setting
The primary tectonic feature of the  island chain is the New Hebrides Trench, the convergent boundary of the Australian and Pacific Plates. Volcanic activity is also present along this north-northwest trending and northeast-dipping oceanic trench.

While much of the island arc experiences intermediate-depth earthquakes along a Wadati–Benioff zone that dips steeply at 70°, the area adjacent to the d'Entrecasteaux Ridge does not. There is a corresponding gap in seismicity that occurs below  where it intrudes into the subduction zone from the west. The uncertainty, which also affects the Tonga arc, is due to the influence of spreading at the North Fiji Basin. Of the 58 M7 or greater events that occurred between 1909 and 2001, few were studied.

Earthquakes

See also
List of tectonic plate interactions
List of volcanoes in Vanuatu

References

Sources

External links
Predicting Earthquake Hazard in Vanuatu
Solomon & Vanuatu Islands—Earthquakes & Tectonic Setting – IRIS Consortium

Vanuatu
Earthquakes
Earthquakes in Vanuatu